Chelyabinsk State University is a public university in Chelyabinsk, Russia. It was established in 1976 and is considered to be one of the leading academic institutions in the Ural region. Member of Association of Classical Universities of Russia and Eurasian Association of Universities.

History
On April 3, 1974, Council of Ministers of the Soviet Union decided on establishment of Chelyabinsk State University - the first university of the Southern Ural.

On October 4, 1976, the official opening took place. In the beginning, university offered education at two faculties - Faculty of Physics and Mathematics, Faculty of History and Philology.

In 1980, five faculties were established: Faculty of Mathematics, Faculty of Physics, Faculty of Economics, Faculty of History, and Faculty of Philology. In 1981, four postgraduate training programs in four fields were launched.

In the following years, number of structural divisions of the university increased up to 19 faculties, 6 institutes, and 91 departments.

University became strategic partner of Makeyev Rocket Design Bureau and All-Russian Scientific Research Institute Of Technical Physics.

In 1987, one of CSU expedition troops had discovered a fortified settlement Arkaim. Today the "Country of Towns" is recognized as an object of cultural heritage of Russia.

In 1991, the first issue of the scientific journal CSU Bulletin was released.

In 1994, doctoral programs were launched at CSU, and university joined the TEMPUS program.

In 1997, a scientific center of nature and human study, based on archeological laboratory, was founded.

In 1998, Faculty of Eurasia and East was created at CSU, the main task of which was to saturate Chelyabinsk region with the necessary personnel and programs in cooperation with the countries of the East.

Since 2001, alumni of the university have an opportunity to get the European Diploma Supplement.

In 2013, university physicists made a significant contribution to astronomical science: they were the first to study Chelyabinsk meteor that fell into Lake Chebarkul, and these scientific calculations became fundamental in the study of the cosmic body.

In 2016 a group of scientists published a book called “Chelyabinsk Superbolid “ about that famous meteorite. The same year, a college was opened that started to implement programs of secondary vocational education.

In 2023, building of university campus was started.

Today the structure of the University includes 13 faculties and in 7 educational and research institutes. The University has three branches (Miass, Troitsk, and Kostanay (Kazakhstan)), and 13 offices (Argayash, Verkhniy Ufaley, Zlatoust, Shadrinsk, Kopeysk, Orsk, Nyazepetrovsk, Trekhgorny, Yuzhnouralsk, Satka, Kyshtym, Varna, Ust-Katav).

Administration
In accordance with the legislation of the Russian Federation and Chelyabinsk State University Charter, the University management is carried out by the Rector, who is elected in a secret vote at the Conference for a five-year term.

Rector of the University determines its structure, staff list, controls the issues concerning educational, scientific, economical and financial university activities, heads the Academic Council.

The faculty deans are elected by the university Academic Council in a secret vote for the term of five years. Heads of the university departments are also to be elected by the Academic Council. As for directors of the institutes and regional offices, their election is appointed by the Rector's order.

The overall university management is carried out by the elected representative body, namely the Senate of the Academic Council of the University, consisting of the Rector (the chairman), Pro-Rectors and Deans of the faculties. Other members of the Academic Council are elected by secret ballot at the Conference.

In order to settle the most important questions concerning the vital university activities, the University Conference is summoned by the Rector and the Academic Council, composed of the university academic staff along with other occupational groups and students.

Rectors
In 1976, S.E. Matushkin, a corresponding member of the USSR Academy of Pedagogical Sciences, became the first rector of Chelyabinsk State University.

In 1987, V.D. Batukhtin, Professor of Physics and Mathematics, became a rector.

In 2004, A.Yu. Shatin, Professor of Economics, was elected as a rector.

In 2014, Diana Tsiring, Professor of Psychology, was elected as a rector.

Since 2019, Sergey Taskaev, Professor of Physics and Mathematics, is a rector. Before that, he was Dean of the Faculty of Physics.

Academics

Post-graduate studies
Foreign citizens are accepted into the post-graduate and doctoral studies on the basis of international agreements and intergovernmental agreements of the Russian Federation, as well the contracts of Chelyabinsk State University, which consider tuition by either legal bodies or individuals.

To enter a post-graduate studies programmes an applicant has to have a higher education degree (Specialist or master's degree). The program lasts 3 or 4 years.

Foreign citizens without knowledge of the Russian language are enrolled in preparatory one-year course.

Doctoral studies programmes
Foreign citizens are accepted into the post-graduate and doctoral studies on the basis of international agreements and intergovernmental agreements of the Russian Federation, as well the contracts of Chelyabinsk State University, which consider tuition by either legal bodies or individuals.

To enter a doctoral studies programme an applicant is obliged to have a post-graduate degree, which is equal to the Russian "Candidate of Science" degree. The program lasts 3 years.

Foreign citizens without knowledge of the Russian language are enrolled in preparatory one-year course.

Faculties and Institutes
The following are the Faculties and Institutes of the University: 
Faculty of Biology 
Faculty of Chemistry 
Faculty of Ecology 
Faculty of Economics
Faculty of Journalism
Faculty of History and Philology
Faculty of Eurasia and East
Faculty of Extra Mural and Distant Education
Faculty of Fundamental Medicine
Faculty of Linguistics and Translation
Faculty of Mathematics
Faculty of Physics
Faculty of Psychology and Pedagogy
Institute of Economics of Industry, Business and Administration
Institute of Information Technologies 
Institute of International Education
Institute of Law
Institute of Professional Development and Retraining
Laboratory of Quantum Topology
Management Faculty
Russian language Courses

The Institute for International Education provides Foundation courses for international students to study the Russian language before enrollment in Bachelor's or master's degree programs.

International cooperation 
Chelyabinsk State University constantly develops international cooperation the history of which started back in 1994, when the University first began acting as a member of TEMPUS program. As a result of enhanced communication between the universities and the effective common work in the framework of TEMPUS project CSU lecturers, and management got a clear impression of how the European educational process is organized.

Today CSU has agreements with foreign partners from Austria, Vietnam, Germany, Iran, Spain, Italy, China, France, Switzerland, etc. and intensively develops research and academic cooperation. The University is a platform for international conferences including those indexing the materials by WoS and Scopus.

International students from more than 20 countries choose Chelyabinsk State University and annually come to study here.

Faculty of Eurasia and East has more than 20 foreign partner universities, such as Shenyang Normal University, Hebei University of Economics and Business, Liaocheng University, Ehime University, Tashkent State University of Oriental Studies, Shenyang University, L. N. Gumilyov Eurasian National University, and others.

The academic journal "The Sign. Problematic Areas of Media Education" by the Faculty of Journalism of the Chelyabinsk State University has been included in the European Reference Index of the Humanities and the Social Sciences (ERIH PLUS) which is a reference database for the humanities and the social sciences.

Rankings  
 1 in RAEX Ural Federal District Universities Rating 2023
 27-38 in Superjob Russian universities rating by salaries in economics and finances 2022
 32-33 in Rating of publication activity of Russian universities (section Mathematics) according to analytical center "Expert" 2022
 37 in Vladimir Potanin Foundation Universities Rating 2022
 40 in Forbes Russian Universities Rankings 2020
 55-71 in Superjob Russian universities rating by salaries in IT 2022
 56 (among Russian universities) in Nature Index 2021
 61 in Media activity university rating 2023
 83 (among Russian universities) in SCImago Institutions Rankings 2022
 83 in HeadHunter Best Regional Russian Universities Rating 2020/21
 Top-100 in National Aggregated Rating of Russian Universities 2022
 110-134 (among Russian universities) in QS Emerging Europe & Central Asia Rankings 2022
 173-177 in Interfax National Universities Rating 2022

References

External links
 

Universities in Chelyabinsk Oblast
Chelyabinsk
Buildings and structures in Chelyabinsk Oblast